{{DISPLAYTITLE:C13H16F3N3O4}}
The molecular formula C13H16F3N3O4 (molar mass: 335.28 g/mol, exact mass: 335.1092 u) may refer to:

 Benfluralin
 Trifluralin

Molecular formulas